Saldam is a rural locality (a selo) located in the Todzhinsky District of Tuva, Russia. Population:  It is one of the places that claims to be the geographical midpoint of Asia.

References

Notes

Sources

Rural localities in Tuva